Duke of Cumberland is a peerage title that was conferred upon junior members of the British Royal Family, named after the historic county of Cumberland.

History
The Earldom of Cumberland, created in 1525, became extinct in 1643. The dukedom was created in the Peerage of England in 1644 for Prince Rupert of the Rhine, nephew of King Charles I. When he died without male heirs, the title was created again in the Peerage of England in 1689 for Prince George of Denmark, husband of Princess Anne, younger daughter of King James II. He also died without heirs, in 1708. Neither of these men, however, was usually known by his peerage title.

The third creation, in the Peerage of Great Britain, was for Prince William, the third son of King George II. Other titles granted to Prince William were Marquess of Berkhampstead, Earl of Kennington, Viscount Trematon and Baron Alderney. Since the Prince died unmarried and without children, his titles became extinct at his death.

The titles Duke of Cumberland and Strathearn and Duke of Cumberland and Teviotdale were later created in the Peerage of Great Britain.

List of titleholders

Dukes of Cumberland, first creation (1644)

| Prince RupertHouse of Wittelsbach1644–1682also: Earl of Holderness (1644)
| 
| 17 December 1619Pragueson of Frederick V, Elector Palatine and Elizabeth Stuart, Queen of Bohemia
| Never Married
| 29 November 1682Westminsteraged 62
|-
| colspan="5" |Nephew of Charles I, died without legitimate issue.
|-
|}

Dukes of Cumberland, second creation (1689)

| Prince GeorgeHouse of Oldenburg1689–1708also: Earl of Kendal and Baron Wokingham (1689)
| 
| 2 June 1653Copenhagen Castleson of Frederick III of Denmark and Sophie Amalie of Brunswick-Lüneburg
| Anne28 July 16831 child
| 28 October 1708Kensington Palaceaged 55
|-
| colspan="5" |Husband of Queen Anne, died without surviving issue.
|-
|}

Dukes of Cumberland, third creation (1726)

|Prince William also Marquess of Berkhamstead, Earl of Kennington, Viscount Trematon and Baron Alderney (Great Britain, 1726)
| 
|26 April 1721Leicester House, London son of George II of Great Britain and Caroline of Ansbach
|Never married
|31 October 1765 London  aged 44
|-
| colspan="5"|Also known as "Butcher" Cumberland and Sweet William.
|}

Dukes of Cumberland and Strathearn (1766)

The sole title-holder was Prince Henry (1745–1790), third son of Frederick, Prince of Wales. He died without legitimate issue, when the dukedom again became extinct.

Dukes of Cumberland and Teviotdale (1799)

This double dukedom, in the Peerage of Great Britain, was bestowed on Prince Ernest Augustus (1771–1851) (later King of Hanover), the fifth son and eighth child of King George III of the United Kingdom and King of Hanover. In 1919 it was suspended under the Titles Deprivation Act 1917 and  has not been restored to its titular heir.

Family tree

Contract bridge
An historic fixed bridge hand is known as the Duke of Cumberland hand. The hand also appeared in Ian Fleming's James Bond thriller, Moonraker.

References

See also

Extinct dukedoms in the Peerage of England
Extinct dukedoms in the Peerage of Great Britain
Noble titles created in 1644
Noble titles created in 1689
Noble titles created in 1726
1644 establishments in England